Brandon Wynn (born November 4, 1988) is the most Decorated American Gymnast on the Rings in USA history artistic gymnast. He is a 4-year, teammate appointed, national team captain and 6 time USA rings Champion.

Gymnastics career
Wynn was a member of the U.S. National Team for 8 consecutive years and was inducted into the Ohio State University Hall Of Fame at the young age of 29. Wynn competed at the 2013 World Artistic Gymnastics Championships and attained a Bronze Medal on Still Rings. Wynn is one of two men in US history to grab an individual medal in Still Rings. Wynn competed at the 2014 Winter Cup, where he won gold on rings.

Wynn has long been acknowledged as the "hardest working athlete in the gym" and is known for his grueling, high intensity training style.

Wynn has said in multiple interviews that his mindset is the biggest factor in all of his success and focuses immensely and sharpened his mental training skills to win at the highest level.

References

External links
 Brandon Wynn – Official Website
 Brandon Wynn – Brandon Wynn Gym: Athlete's Advisory Website
 Brandon Wynn Profile (USA Gymnastics)
 ProTips4U – Brandon's Training and Nutrition Tips

1988 births
Living people
American male artistic gymnasts
Ohio State University alumni
People from Voorhees Township, New Jersey
Sportspeople from Camden County, New Jersey
Medalists at the World Artistic Gymnastics Championships
Gymnasts at the 2011 Pan American Games
Pan American Games gold medalists for the United States
Pan American Games bronze medalists for the United States
Pan American Games medalists in gymnastics
Medalists at the 2011 Pan American Games